A condyle (from ; κόνδυλος knuckle) is the round prominence at the end of a bone, most often part of a joint – an articulation with another bone. It is one of the markings or features of bones, and can refer to:
 On the femur, in the knee joint:
 Medial condyle
 Lateral condyle
 On the tibia, in the knee joint:
 Medial condyle
 Lateral condyle
 On the humerus, in the elbow joint:
 Condyle of humerus (Condylus humeri)
 On the mandible, in the temporomandibular joint:
 Mandibular condyle
 On the occipital bone, in the atlanto-occipital joint:
 Occipital condyles

Although not generally termed condyles, the trochlea and capitulum of the humerus act as condyles in the elbow, and the femur head acts as a condyle in the hip joint.

References

Skeletal system